David David (October 14, 1764 – November 30, 1824) was a Canadian fur trader, businessman, and militia officer. David David was born in Montreal to Lazarus David and Phebe Samuel; he was the first Jew born in the province of Quebec.

References

 

1764 births
1824 deaths
Canadian Jews
Canadian fur traders
Jews and Judaism in Quebec
Pre-Confederation Canadian businesspeople
19th-century Canadian Jews